The Holiday 20 is an American sailing dinghy that was designed by Harry R. Sindle as a day sailer and first built in 1973.

Production
The design was built by Newport Boats in Newport, California, United States, starting in 1973, but it is now out of production.

Design
The Holiday 20 is a recreational sailboat, built predominantly of fiberglass, with wood trim. It has a fractional sloop rig, a spooned raked stem, a plumb transom, a transom-hung rudder controlled by a tiller and a retractable centerboard. It displaces .

See also
List of sailing boat types

References

External links
Photo of a Holiday 20

Dinghies
1970s sailboat type designs
Sailboat type designs by Harry R. Sindle
Sailboat types built by Newport Boats